High Hill is an unincorporated community in Muskingum County, in the U.S. state of Ohio.

History
High Hill was named for the lofty elevation of the town site.  A post office called High Hill was established in 1847, and remained in operation until 1901. Besides the post office, High Hill had an Odd Fellows hall and two country stores.

References

Unincorporated communities in Muskingum County, Ohio
1847 establishments in Ohio
Populated places established in 1847
Unincorporated communities in Ohio